The National Conference of Australian Christian Churches is the biennial conference for the leadership of Australian Christian Churches, the Australian branch of the Assemblies of God (AOG). The first conference, held in 1937, founded the denomination by the amalgamation of the Pentecostal Church of Australia and the Assemblies of God in Queensland. Scott Morrison gave a speech to the conference in 2021.

About
The National Conference is a gathering of Australian Christian Churches leaders across Australia to enjoy fellowship with each other and to discuss and vote on important issues as a denomination. The National Conference, along with the State Conferences, let pastors and leaders join as a denomination and be empowered and encouraged. The National Conference brings pastors and leaders up to date on the state of the denomination by the National Executive, finding out how each of the departments and ministries are going.

List of National Conferences

References

See also

 Australian Christian Churches